Fructose-1-phosphate is a derivative of fructose. It is generated mainly by hepatic fructokinase but is also generated in smaller amounts in the small intestinal mucosa and proximal epithelium of the renal tubule. It is an important intermediate of glucose metabolism. Because fructokinase has a high Vmax fructose entering cells is quickly phosphorylated to fructose 1-phosphate. In this form it is usually accumulated in the liver until it undergoes further conversion by aldolase B (the rate limiting enzyme of fructose metabolism).

Aldolase B converts it into glyceraldehyde and dihydroxyacetone phosphate (DHAP). Glyceraldehyde is then phosphorylated by triose kinase to glyceraldehyde 3-phosphate. Metabolism of fructose thus essentially results in intermediates of glycolysis. This means that fructose has the same fate as glucose after it gets metabolised. The final product of glycolysis (pyruvate) may then undergo gluconeogenesis, enter the TCA cycle or be stored as fatty acids.

Clinical significance
In hereditary fructose intolerance caused by defects in aldolase B, fructose 1-phosphate accumulates in the liver and causes a number of adverse defects. Hypoglycemia results from inhibition of glycogenolysis and gluconeogenesis. It depletes intracellular phosphate reserves which leads to loss of ATP and inhibition of biosynthetic pathways. Symptoms of hereditary fructose intolerance are apathy, drowsiness, sweatiness and tremulousness.

References

Monosaccharide derivatives
Organophosphates